Our Lady and St Peter's Church is a Roman Catholic Parish church in East Grinstead. It was built from 1897 to 1898 and designed by Frederick Walters. It is situated on the London Road close to where it becomes Station Road, north of East Grinstead railway station. It is a Romanesque Revival church and a Grade II listed building.

History

Foundation
In 1879, a Catholic mission was started in East Grinstead. It came from Crawley and was dedicated to St Edward and St Louis. It was founded by Sir Edward and Lady Gertrude Blount. The mission was centred in the chapel of Imberhorne Manor, the home of the Blounts. Sir Edward Blount came from Shropshire and was the son of Edward Blount, a member of the House of Commons for Steyning. After founding the Blount Père et Fils Bank in 1831 (which merged with Société Générale in 1870), and being knighted, he retired to Sussex.

Construction
On 15 June 1897, the foundation stone was laid. The architect was Frederick Walters. Lady Blount died during construction of the church. On 2 October 1898, the church was opened. In 1899, stained glass windows were installed in the north east chapel. They were made by Hardman & Co., given by the Blounts and dedicated to St Gertrude and St Edward. Most of the fittings in the church was designed by Walters. Also in 1899, the church was consecrated.

Parish
Our Lady and St Peter's Church's parish also includes St Bernard's Church on Vicarage Road in Lingfield, Surrey. It was built in 1956. Formerly in the parish was Our Lady of the Forest Church in Forest Row. It was built in the 1950s, closed in 2009, and was once visited by John F. Kennedy on 29 June 1963, during his stay at Harold Macmillan's house at Birch Grove, part of his only official visit to the UK.

Our Lady and St Peter's Church has two Sunday Masses at 6.15pm on Saturday and at 10:30am on Sunday. St Bernard's Church has one Sunday Mass at 9:00am. Our Lady and St Peter's Church has its weekdays Masses at 9:30am.

See also
 List of places of worship in Mid Sussex
 Roman Catholic Diocese of Arundel and Brighton

References

External links
 
 
 East Grinstead Catholic Parish site

Our Lady and Saint Peter
Roman Catholic churches in West Sussex
Grade II listed churches in West Sussex
Grade II listed Roman Catholic churches in England
Romanesque Revival church buildings in England
Roman Catholic churches completed in 1898
1879 establishments in England
19th-century Roman Catholic church buildings in the United Kingdom
Frederick Walters buildings